Edward Gammon (14 November 1876 – 10 December 1955) was a Trinidadian cricketer. He played in one first-class match for Trinidad and Tobago in 1909/10.

See also
 List of Trinidadian representative cricketers

References

External links
 

1876 births
1955 deaths
Trinidad and Tobago cricketers